Thomas Emlen Franklin (April 20, 1810 – November 28, 1884) was an American lawyer from Pennsylvania who served two terms as state attorney general.

Personal life and career

Franklin was born in Philadelphia, the son of Walter Franklin and Anne Emlen.  His father at the time was serving as state attorney general, and upon his father's appointment to a judgeship in 1811, the family moved to Lancaster, Pennsylvania.

Franklin graduated from Yale College in 1828 and was admitted to the bar in 1831, opening an office in Lancaster, where he resided for the rest of his life.

In 1837, he married Serena A. Mayer.  They had 11 children.  Two sons became lawyers, and two daughters married lawyers.

Franklin was twice appointed attorney general for the state.  He was a delegate to U. S. presidential nomination conventions three times (1844, Henry Clay; 1848, Zachary Taylor; 1864, Abraham Lincoln).  He declined all offers to be further involved in politics.

In local business, he was a founding director for the Lancaster, Portsmouth, and Harrisburg Railroad Company (later part of the Pennsylvania Railroad Company), a director of the Farmers' National Bank, and president of the Lancaster Fire Insurance Company.

Franklin was active in Episcopalian Church affairs, and in his later years served as chancellor of the diocese for central Pennsylvania.

References

Further reading

External links
 1838 portrait by Jacob Eichholtz.

1810 births
1884 deaths
Pennsylvania Attorneys General
Pennsylvania lawyers
Yale College alumni
19th-century American politicians
19th-century American lawyers